Maktab al-Nasser prison is a prison in the Abu Salim district of Tripoli, Libya.  Prior to the fall of Muammar Gaddafi's government in the 2011 Libyan civil war, it served as a prison and office of the internal security agency.  Many of the prisoners held there would often be later transferred to Abu Salim prison.

References 

Prisons in Libya
Organizations based in Tripoli, Libya